The Avion Newspaper is the student-led college newspaper of Embry-Riddle Aeronautical University in Daytona Beach, Florida, United States. The Avion publishes weekly, and has a print circulation of approximately 1,000. The newspaper has a history dating back to Embry-Riddle's earliest days in Miami.

Publication schedule
The Avion is published weekly during the fall and spring semesters, a total of 13 issues per semester. It is published bi-weekly in the summer, a total of six times. The Avion publishes three special issues: an orientation edition in late August, a Halloween Edition, also known as The Scaryoff, on October 31, and an April Fools' Day edition, also known as The Avioff, on April 1.

Subscriptions
The newspaper is distributed free of charge to students, faculty, staff and visitors. Mail subscriptions are available for $20 per year.

Organization
The Avion is a division of the Embry-Riddle Student Government Association, which partially funds the organization. The newspaper is run entirely by students, and most of the contributors are volunteers.

The Editor-in-Chief is elected by a majority vote of the newspaper's staff and receives a 25% tuition voucher for his or her services. Executive board members are appointed by the Editor-in-Chief, and each executive board member receives a 10% tuition voucher.

Layout

The Avion is a weekly tabloid newspaper and consists of four sections. The first section consists primarily of campus news and student opinions. The second section presents a collection of news in the aviation and aerospace industries. The third section is dedicated to the university's athletic teams. The fourth section is anchored by the entertainment page, and also carries the comics and classifieds.

Current executive board members 
Editor-in-Chief: Dylan Kowlessar
Managing Editor: Mikyla Berish
News Editor: Danielle Van Pelt
Business Manager: Andrew Harker
Photo Editor: Kyle Navarro

External links 
 The Avions website
 The Avions digital issues

References

Student newspapers published in Florida
Embry–Riddle Aeronautical University